Are You Proud? is a 2019 documentary about LGBT pride directed by Ashley Joiner.

References

External links
 

2019 documentary films
2019 films
Documentary films about LGBT culture
British LGBT-related films
2019 LGBT-related films
British documentary films
2010s English-language films
2010s British films